Obrium glabrum is a species of beetle in the family Cerambycidae. It was described by Knull in 1937.

References

Obriini
Beetles described in 1937